The 2012 Vietnamese Cup was the 20th edition of the Vietnamese Cup. It started on 18 December 2011 and finished on 29 August 2012.

The cup winner qualified for the 2013 AFC Cup.

First round

Second round

Quarter-finals

Semi-finals 

1 In April, Sai gon were renamed Sài Gòn Xuân Thành

Final

References 
  Official website

Vietnamese National Cup
Cup